is a Japanese tarento and model represented by A-Light. She is nicknamed .

Biography
Hosoi debuted as a reader model in the magazine Egg in 2006. Her first appearance in the magazine's pin-cover was in August 2007, and gained the nickname "Romihi" from the readers. Hosoi appeared in the cover of Egg 24 times. In August 2012, she graduated and announced that she would be moved to S Cawaii!.  Although a short model, Hosoi's appearance is popular among fans and readers.  On December 14, 2009, she won first place in the "2010-nen no Fashion Leader wa Dare ka" of Mezamashi TV.

Hosoi is friends with Kanako Kawabata, Aya Suzuki, and Rui Kotobuki from the same agency and they have appeared together at various events.

Filmography

TV series

Magazines

Internet series

Other

References

External links
 
 
 

Japanese television personalities
Japanese female models
1989 births
Living people
People from Tokyo
Models from Tokyo Metropolis